The Senegal gerbil or Senegal tateril (Taterillus pygargus) is a species of rodent found in Niger, Senegal, possibly Gambia, possibly Mali, and possibly Mauritania. Its natural habitats are dry savanna, subtropical or tropical dry shrubland, arable land, pastureland, and rural gardens.

References

Musser, G. G. and M. D. Carleton. 2005. Superfamily Muroidea. pp. 894–1531 in Mammal Species of the World a Taxonomic and Geographic Reference. D. E. Wilson and D. M. Reeder eds. Johns Hopkins University Press, Baltimore.

Taterillus
Mammals described in 1838
Rodents of Africa
Taxonomy articles created by Polbot